Truman George Yuncker (March 20, 1891 – January 8, 1964) was a taxonomic botanist best known for his work in the family Piperaceae. Yuncker first taught at Manual High School in Indianapolis, Indiana. After service in World War I, he received his doctorate from the University of Illinois in 1919. Soon after, he became a faculty member at DePauw University and became head of the botany and bacteriology department in 1921 and held that post until retirement in 1956. During his tenure he described 839 new species, 211 new varieties and 25 new formae in the Piperaceae. He wrote the treatment of that family in almost every regional flora published during his lifetime. His early studies were on the genus Cuscuta, in which he described 67 new species and 39 new varieties.

Footnotes

External links
 

1891 births
1964 deaths
American botanists
University of Illinois Urbana-Champaign alumni
DePauw University faculty